The singles discography of American country artist Dottie West contains 71 singles, 12 collaborative singles, 3 promotional singles and 1 other charting song. West signed with RCA Victor Records in 1963, having her first Top 40 hit the same year. It was followed in 1964 by "Love Is No Excuse", a duet with Jim Reeves that became West's first top 10 hit. In 1964, she also released "Here Comes My Baby". The song reached number 10 on the Billboard Hot Country Singles chart and became the first song by a female country artist to win a Grammy award. From her 1966 album, West issued four singles, including the top 10 hits "Would You Hold It Against Me" and "What's Come Over My Baby". Over the next two years she had major hits with "Paper Mansions", "Like a Fool", "Country Girl", and "Reno". In 1969, West collaborated with Don Gibson on "Rings of Gold", which reached number 2 on the Billboard country chart. In 1973, she released a single version of a commercial jingle originally used by The Coca-Cola Company. Entitled "Country Sunshine", the song became West's biggest hit, reaching number 2 on the country songs chart and number 49 on the Billboard Hot 100. The song also nominated her for her eleventh Grammy. After releasing the top 10 hit "Last Time I Saw Him" (1974), West's chart hits declined and she was dropped from RCA in 1976.

Switching to United Artists Records, West's first single "When It's Just You and Me" became a top 20 country hit. In 1978 she paired with Kenny Rogers on "Every Time Two Fools Collide". The song became her first number one single on the Billboard country chart. Their success revitalized West's career and won the pair the Country Music Association's Vocal Duo of the Year award in 1978 and 1979. During the late 1970s, the pair had 3 more top 10 hits with "Anyone Who Isn't Me Tonight", "All I Ever Need Is You", and "'Til I Can Make It on My Own". Their 1981 single, "What Are We Doin' in Love", went to number one and became a top 15 crossover hit on the Billboard Hot 100. West's 1979 album included her 1980 single "A Lesson in Leavin'". The song became West's first number one solo hit on the Billboard country chart. The album's additional singles ("You Pick Me Up and Put Me Down" and "Leavin's for Unbelievers") became top twenty country hits that year. The lead single off her 1981 album called "Are You Happy Baby" would also reach the top spot of the Billboard country songs list. After a top twenty hit with "It's High Time" (1982) and a successful duet with Kenny Rogers (1984), West's singles began peaking outside the Billboard country top 40. Her 1985 single "We Know Better Now" became her final chart appearance, peaking at number 53 on the Hot Country Singles & Tracks chart.

Singles

As lead artist

As a collaborative artist

Promotional singles

Other charting songs

Notes

References

External links 
 Dottie West singles at 45 Cat.com

Country music discographies